Bellheim is a Verbandsgemeinde ("collective municipality") in the district of Germersheim, Rhineland-Palatinate, Germany. The seat of the Verbandsgemeinde is in Bellheim.

The Verbandsgemeinde Bellheim consists of the following Ortsgemeinden ("local municipalities"):

 Bellheim
 Knittelsheim
 Ottersheim bei Landau
 Zeiskam

External links
 http://www.bellheim.de/ Verbandsgemeinde Bellheim

Verbandsgemeinde in Rhineland-Palatinate